Crosseana is a genus of minute freshwater snails with an operculum, aquatic gastropod molluscs or micromolluscs in the family Tateidae.

Species
 Crosseana crosseana (Gassies, 1874)
 Crosseana fallax (Haase & Bouchet, 1998)
 Crosseana melanosoma (Haase & Bouchet, 1998)

References

External links
 Zielske S. & Haase M. (2015). Molecular phylogeny and a modified approach of character-based barcoding refining the taxonomy of New Caledonian freshwater gastropods (Caenogastropoda, Truncatelloidea, Tateidae). Molecular Phylogenetics and Evolution. 89: 171-181

 Tateidae